Ross Douglas is an American football coach and former player who is the assistant wide receivers coach for the New England Patriots of the National Football League (NFL). Having played his college career at Michigan and Rutgers in a variety of offensive and defensive positions, he went undrafted in the 2018 NFL Draft and began a career in coaching. Having served as a graduate assistant at Rutgers until the end of 2020, he briefly became cornerbacks coach at Richmond before accepting a Bill Walsh Diversity Coaching Fellowship with the New England Patriots. He currently serves as an assistant wide receivers coach.

Playing career
Ross Douglas went to high school in Avon, Ohio. A three star prospect at cornerback, he committed to play for the University of Michigan in 2012. Over three seasons in Michigan Douglas struggled to find a definitive position, playing defensive back, wide receiver, and running back. He played in 18 games for the Wolverines before in April 2016 he transferred to Rutgers University. There Douglas played as a hybrid safety/linebacker, and over two seasons had 13 starts and played in 22 games. Having already completed his undergraduate degree at Michigan, Douglas completed his years of eligibility at Rutgers at the end of 2017, graduating with a masters degree. He went undrafted in the 2018 NFL Draft, failing a try-out with the Pittsburgh Steelers at rookie minicamp.

Coaching career

Rutgers and Richmond
Douglas chose to disregard further attempts to play in the National Football League (NFL) and instead went back to Rutgers as a coach. Under Chris Ash Douglas initially served in the recruiting department before becoming a graduate assistant on defence. Douglas was kept on when Greg Schiano took over in 2020, continuing in his role on defence. After the end of the 2020 season Douglas accepted a position as cornerbacks coach with the University of Richmond.

New England Patriots
Douglas stayed at Richmond only briefly; having come to the attention of the New England Patriots he received a Bill Walsh Diversity Coaching Fellowship in June, replacing Cole Popovich.

At the end of the 2020 minicamp Douglas was offered a full-time role by the Patriots, working on defence in quality control. In 2021 several assistant coaches left the team for the Las Vegas Raiders under ex-offensive coordinator Josh McDaniels. Douglas was subsequently moved to work with the Patriots wide receivers. Before the start of the 2022 season Patriots head coach Bill Belichick initially declined to reveal the exact titles taken on by his assistant coaches, with it being suggested that Douglas would become the wide receivers coach.

References

People from Lorain County, Ohio
New England Patriots coaches
University of Michigan alumni
Rutgers University alumni
Michigan Wolverines football players
Rutgers Scarlet Knights football players

Living people
Year of birth missing (living people)